Szilvia Szabolcsi (born 12 October 1977) is a Hungarian cyclist. She competed in two events at the 2000 Summer Olympics.

References

1977 births
Living people
Hungarian female cyclists
Olympic cyclists of Hungary
Cyclists at the 2000 Summer Olympics
Cyclists from Budapest